Rachael Cabral-Guevara (born August 10, 1976) is an American nurse practitioner, educator, and Republican politician from Appleton, Wisconsin. She is a member of the Wisconsin Senate, representing the 19th Senate district since January 2023.  She previously served in the Wisconsin State Assembly, representing the 55th Assembly district during the 2021–2022 session.

Early life and career 
Cabral-Guevara was born in Appleton, Wisconsin, but moved frequently as a child of a member of the United States Air Force.  She returned to Wisconsin to attend college, first receiving her bachelor's degree in biology from Milwaukee's Mount Mary University, then receiving another bachelor's degree in nursing from the University of Wisconsin–Oshkosh.  She continued her education at the University of Wisconsin–Milwaukee, where she earned her master's degree in nursing in 2008. Cabral-Guevara became a board certified family nurse practitioner and licensed advanced practice nurse prescriber, and worked at various health care facilities around Appleton.  From 2008 to 2019, she also served as a lecturer in the College of Nursing at University of Wisconsin–Oshkosh.

In 2014, she opened Nurse Practitioner Health Services LLC, a cash-based health clinic targeted to those without insurance or those with high deductibles looking for lower cost alternatives.  They opened a second location in Howard, Wisconsin, outside Green Bay, in 2016.

Political career 
In October 2019, three-term incumbent state representative Mike Rohrkaste announced he would retire at the end of the current term.  Cabral-Guevara had already expressed interest in running for the Wisconsin State Assembly and, on the announcement of Rohrkaste's retirement, immediately confirmed that she would enter the race for the 55th assembly district seat.  She made an official announcement of her campaign for the Republican nomination in the district the following February.  Cabral-Guevara faced two opponents in the Republican primary—Neenah School Board member Lauri Asbury and perennial candidate and conservative activist Jay Schroeder.  The primary grew contentious, with Asbury making an issue of Cabral-Guevara receiving roughly $35,000 worth of campaign support from Virginia-based electioneering PAC Make Liberty Win, and Schroeder attacking Cabral-Guevara over her willingness to explore legalization of recreational marijuana.  Cabral-Guevara responded by charging that supporters of her opponents were engaged in a campaign of hate mail and vandalism against her, including death threats and racism.  In the August primary, Cabral-Guevara won a substantial victory, taking nearly 60% of the vote.

In the November general election, she faced Democrat Dan Schierl, who had previously run against Rohrkaste in 2018.  For the general election, Cabral-Guevara pushed a campaign agenda of affordable health care, lower taxes, and improved educational outcomes in the state.  With the campaign taking place during the COVID-19 pandemic, Cabral-Guevara also declared her opposition to any business restrictions or limitations to prevent the spread of the virus.  Cabral-Guevara prevailed in the general election, carrying nearly 55% of the vote.

On March 17, 2022, Cabral-Guevara announced that she would be running for the 19th State Senate District. The incumbent, Roger Roth, vacated the seat to run for lieutenant governor. She prevailed over Appleton Alderperson Kristin Alfheim in the November 8, 2022 election.

Personal life and family
Rachael Cabral-Guevara has four children and resides on Stroebe Island in the village of Fox Crossing, Wisconsin.  In the summers, she provides volunteer medical care in migrant camps within Wisconsin.

She is a member of the Wisconsin Nursing Association, the American Nursing Association, the American Nurses Credentialing Center, and the Sigma Theta Tau Honor Society of Nursing.

Electoral history

Wisconsin Assembly (2020)

| colspan="6" style="text-align:center;background-color: #e9e9e9;"| Republican Primary, August 11, 2020

| colspan="6" style="text-align:center;background-color: #e9e9e9;"| General Election, November 3, 2020

Wisconsin Senate (2022)

| colspan="6" style="text-align:center;background-color: #e9e9e9;"| Republican Primary, August 9, 2022

| colspan="6" style="text-align:center;background-color: #e9e9e9;"| General Election, November 8, 2022

References

External links

 
 Campaign website
 55th Assembly District (2011–2021)
 Nurse Practitioner Health Services
 Rachael Cabral-Guevara at LinkedIn

1976 births
Living people
Politicians from Appleton, Wisconsin
Women state legislators in Wisconsin
Republican Party members of the Wisconsin State Assembly
Republican Party Wisconsin state senators
21st-century American politicians
21st-century American women politicians
University of Wisconsin–Oshkosh alumni
University of Wisconsin–Milwaukee alumni
American women nurses
Date of birth uncertain
Year of birth uncertain
American politicians of Salvadoran descent
Hispanic and Latino American state legislators in Wisconsin
Hispanic and Latino American women in politics
Latino conservatism in the United States